Statistics of Kuwaiti Premier League in the 1966–67 season.

Overview
Al Arabi Kuwait won the championship.

References
RSSSF

Kuwait Premier League seasons
Kuwait
football